Wappingers Central School District (WCSD) is a school district headquartered in the town of East Fishkill, New York, on Corporate Park Drive.

History
On November 30, 1937, in the southern portion of Dutchess County, New York, there was a meeting held to determine the consolidation of area school districts. The district was created after a September 1938 vote within all or portions of several communities in Dutchess and Putnam counties, including Wappinger, East Fishkill, Fishkill, and Poughkeepsie in Dutchess County and Kent and Philipstown in Putnam County, approved the establishment of the WCSD. Upon opening the district had attained 11 schools. In the 1950s the East Fishkill Number 6, Gayhead, Old Hopewell, Shenendoah, and Stormville school districts were consolidated into the Wappingers district.

Schools

High schools
 Roy C. Ketcham High School (Wappinger)
 John Jay High School (Hopewell Junction)

Junior high schools
 Van Wyck Junior High School (East Fishkill)
 Wappingers Junior High School (Wappinger)

Elementary schools
 Brinckerhoff (Fishkill)
 James S. Evans (Wappinger)
 Fishkill (Fishkill)
 Fishkill Plains (East Fishkill)
 Gayhead (Hopewell Junction)
 Kinry Road (Poughkeepsie)
 Myers Corners Elementary School (Wappinger)
 Oak Grove Elementary School (Poughkeepsie)
 Sheafe Road Elementary School (Poughkeepsie)

Alternative schools
 Orchard View Alternative High School (Hopewell Junction)

References

External links
 

School districts in New York (state)
Education in Dutchess County, New York
School districts established in 1938